The Ernest L. Blumenschein House is a historic house museum and art gallery at 222 Ledoux Street in Taos, New Mexico.  It was a home of painter Ernest L. Blumenschein (1874-1960), a co-founder of the Taos Society of Artists and one of the "Taos Six".  It was declared a National Historic Landmark in 1965.

Description and history
The Blumenschein House is located on the south side of Ledoux Street, 1-1/2 blocks south of central plaza in Taos.  It is a single-story adobe structure, with eleven rooms, built in the Spanish Pueblo style with a central courtyard.  A low wall with central opening separate the courtyard from the street.  The house's construction date is uncertain, but its oldest sections probably predate the 1820s.  The interior is furnished to appear as it might have been when the Blumenschein family lived there. It features family possessions, a collection of the family's art, works by other famous Taos artists, and fine European and Spanish Colonial style antiques. The museum is owned and operated by Taos Historic Museums.

Ernest Blumenschein, a native of Pittsburgh, Pennsylvania, was schooled in art in Cincinnati, New York City, and Paris.  While in Paris he met Joseph Henry Sharp, who described a visit he made to Taos in 1883.  Blumenschein and Bert Phillips traveled to Taos in 1898, where they established the Taos Art Colony.  He used this house as a home and studio from 1919 until 1960.  The house itself had previously been used as a home and studio by Herbert Dunton, and was already well known as a gathering point for artists.  The colony formed by these people was broadly influential in exposing the art world to Taos and the desert southwest.  The house remained in the Blumenschein family until 1962, when his heirs donated it to the organization that is now Taos Historic Museums.  After a period as a multiunit residence, it was converted into a museum and gallery space.

Gallery

See also

National Register of Historic Places listings in Taos County, New Mexico
List of National Historic Landmarks in New Mexico

References

External links

E.L. Blumenschein Home and Museum

Adobe buildings and structures in New Mexico
Art museums and galleries in New Mexico
Artists' studios in the United States
Biographical museums in New Mexico
Buildings and structures in Taos, New Mexico
Historic house museums in New Mexico
Houses on the National Register of Historic Places in New Mexico
Museums in Taos, New Mexico
National Historic Landmarks in New Mexico
Pueblo Revival architecture in Taos, New Mexico
Houses in Taos County, New Mexico
National Register of Historic Places in Taos County, New Mexico
Historic district contributing properties in New Mexico
Houses completed in 1823
1823 establishments in Mexico